My Name Is Rachel Corrie is a play based on the diaries and emails of activist Rachel Corrie, who was killed by an Israeli soldier when she was aged 23. It was jointly edited by journalist Katharine Viner and actor Alan Rickman who also directed it.

Rachel Corrie (April 10, 1979 – March 16, 2003) was an American Evergreen State College student and member of the International Solidarity Movement (ISM) who traveled to the Gaza Strip during the Second Intifada. She was killed in the Gaza Strip by a Caterpillar D9R armored bulldozer operated by the Israel Defense Forces (IDF) while protecting the family home of local pharmacist Samir Nasrallah from demolition by the IDF.

Initial stagings and response
Alan Rickman first staged My Name is Rachel Corrie in April 2005 at the Royal Court Theatre, London, and the play went on to win the Theatregoers' Choice Awards for Best Director and Best New Play, as well as Best Solo Performance for actress Megan Dodds.

The play was scheduled to be transferred to the New York Theatre Workshop in March 2006. However, the New York theatre decided that, because of its political content, the play was to be "postponed indefinitely", after the artistic director polled numerous Jewish groups to get their reaction to the play. Rickman and Viner denounced the decision and withdrew the show.

Rickman said: "I can only guess at the pressures of funding an independent theatre company in New York, but calling this production "postponed" does not disguise the fact that it has been cancelled. This is censorship born out of fear, and the New York Theatre Workshop, the Royal Court, New York audiences – all of us are the losers."

The play ran as a commercial production at the Minetta Lane Theatre in Greenwich Village in the fall of 2006.

Reviews

The play received the following review from Michael Billington in April 2005:

The production was reviewed by Peter Birnie of the Vancouver Sun January 29, 2008:

The American record-music producer Clive Davis gave a short assessment of the play for The Times in April 2005:

Other stagings

My Name Is Rachel Corrie played at the West End's Playhouse Theatre in London from March through May 2006. In July 2006 Josephine Taylor took over the role and the show played the Galway Arts Festival, before moving to the Edinburgh Fringe in August. It opened at the Minetta Lane Theatre in New York in October 2006, with Megan Dodds returning as Corrie, and closed on December 17, 2006.

Variety reports:

The Seattle Repertory Theatre ran My Name is Rachel Corrie from March 15 to May 6, 2007, directed by Braden Abraham, featuring Marya Sea Kaminski as Corrie. This showing drew publicity and spawned the creation of a website, Rachel Corrie Facts, intended to provide information and context to balance to what many perceive as a "one-sided, anti-Israel diatribe."

The Australian premiere of My Name is Rachel Corrie opened on May 14, 2008 at Downstairs Belvoir St Theatre. It had an extended season and was nominated for Best Performer (Belinda Bromilow), Best Direction (Shannon Murphy) and Best Independent Production (Bareboards Production) at the Sydney Theatre Critics Awards for 2008, winning the latter. The production was also featured on the SBS television program Dateline.

The Kitchen & Roundhouse Theatre in Silver Spring, Maryland, staged a one-time performance on July 21, 2007. It was directed by Lise Bruneau and featured Mindy Woodhead as Corrie.

My Name Is Rachel Corrie was one of the featured plays of the Contemporary American Theater Festival in Shepherdstown, West Virginia, shown from July 6–29, 2007. Ed Herendeen was the director, and Anne Marie Nest played Corrie.

Purple Bench Productions produced the play in Chicago September 12 – October 5, 2008. Jessie Fisher portrayed Corrie and it was directed by Emmy Kreilkamp.

Some performances have featured post-show discussions.

The New Repertory Theatre in Watertown, Massachusetts staged My Name is Rachel Corrie on March 8 April 5, 2008. Directed by David R. Gammons, featuring Stacy Fischer as Rachel Corrie.  The production was played in rep with Pieces by Israeli-American Zohar Tirosh as part of a larger project entitled Their Voices Will Be Heard: Artists Respond to the Israeli/Palestinian Situation, which also included readings of plays by Nitzan Halperin, Meron Langsner (who at the time was New Rep's NNPN playwright in residence), and Larry Loebell, as well as film screenings and academic panels.  New Rep published a pamphlet of critical responses entitled Supporting Voices/Dissenting Voices which was co-edited by Meron Langsner and M. Bevin O'Garra to accompany the theatrical events.

A reading of the play took place in Dublin, Ireland, on March 15, 2008, at the Project Arts Centre. The reading was presented by Amnesty International Irish Section and Fishamble theatre company. Actress Megan Riordan performed the reading.

In 2007, the play was staged in Lima, Peru, at La Plaza ISIL theater under the direction of Nishme Sumar and featuring Gisela Ponce De Leon as Corrie. This was the first performance of the play in a Spanish-speaking country.

Theatre Yes in Edmonton, Alberta, staged My Name is Rachel Corrie March 28 – April 12, 2008.

Theatre PANIK staged the play at Tarragon Theatre in Toronto, opening May 29, 2008 with Bethany Jillard performing the role. The production was directed by Kate Lushington. All four local daily papers gave the play and the actress enthusiastic reviews, but the theatre critic Lynn Slotkin in CBC Toronto radio show Here and Now was highly critical of every aspect of the play.

The Kraine Theater in Manhattan staged the show under the direction of Ashley Marinaccio and Robert Gonyo of Co-Op Theatre East Co-Op Theatre East. The show was unique in that there were two actors portraying Rachel Corrie — Theresa Christine and Stephanie Shafir as the young Rachel Corrie.

In October, 2015 the play was staged at the Corpus Playroom, Cambridge, UK. Rachel Corrie was portrayed by Ella Duffy, the daughter of Carol Ann Duffy. The show received critical acclaim, described as "a brilliant, barnstorming performance".

The play was staged in Winnipeg, Canada at the Irish Association of Manitoba, as part of the 2016 MayWorks Festival of Labour and the Arts. The staging featured the role of Corrie and the other figures in her life divided between five actors. The production did consultation and post-show talkbacks with Independent Jewish Voices.

The play was produced in Corrie's hometown of Olympia Washington for the first time in 2017 at Harlequin Productions from January 19 to February 11.  The play was directed by Jeff Painter.  The role of Corrie was portrayed by Kira Batcheller.

References

External links
Rachel Corrie Foundation for Peace and Justice International Productions of "My Name is Rachel Corrie" Play Page
Rachel Corrie Memorial Website
"Democracy Now" discussion on the cancellation/postponement of My Name is Rachel Corrie by the NYTW
 The Rachel Corrie Verdict
The Death of Rachel Corrie. Mother Jones
The Subversive Theatre Collective
Rachel Corrie play opens in Haifa
 The Case Against Rachel Corrie
Royal Court Theatre "My Name is Rachel Corrie" Education Resources
Surely Americans will not put up with this censorship, Katharine Viner The Guardian
 The secular beatification of Rachel Corrie sums up everything that is wrong with modern solidarity with Palestine
SBS Dateline feature on the Australian Premiere

Rachel Corrie
2005 plays
British plays
Docudrama plays
Plays for one performer
Plays about the Israeli–Palestinian conflict
Plays based on real people